The Official German Charts are record charts compiled by GfK Entertainment GmbH on behalf of Bundesverband Musikindustrie (Federal Association of Phonographic Industry). They include the "Top 100 Single-Charts" and the "Top 100 Album-Charts". The chart week runs from Friday to Thursday with the official chart being published by various third-party media outlets on the following Friday. The charts are based on sales of physical singles and albums from retail outlets as well as permanent music downloads and streaming.

The first number-one-single of the year was "Rockabye" by Clean Bandit featuring Sean Paul & Anne-Marie, which moved into the top spot in the issue dated 30 December 2016 but remained in place for two weeks before being replaced by "Shape of You" by British singer-songwriter Ed Sheeran. "Shape of You" ruled the charts for 15 consecutive weeks, before being dethroned by "Despacito" by Puerto Rican artists Luis Fonsi featuring Daddy Yankee, which led the charts between April and August for a total of 17 weeks. Axwell Λ Ingrosso's "More Than You Know reached number one on issue date 25 August and stayed there for three weeks. German rappers Kay One, Kollegah and Farid Bang reached the number-one position for the first time with "Señorita" and "Sturmmaske auf (Intro)". Bausa's "Was du Liebe nennst" reached the number-one in mid-October and topped the charts for eight weeks. Ed Sheeran ended the year with "Perfect", his second number-one single of the year. The longest unbroken run at number one in 2017 was 17 weeks, which was achieved by Luis Fonsi's "Despacito". "Shape of You" topped the Year End-Single charts.

Albumwise thirty-three different albums reached the pole-position. The Rolling Stones' Blue & Lonesome became the first album number-one of the year, followed by Klubbb3's Jetzt geht’s richtig los!. Ed Sheeran's ÷ became the first album of the year to top the chart for longer than a week in March. Helene Fischer's eponymous album reached the pole-position in May and later topped the year-end album charts. Other albums to top the charts for multiple weeks were Sing meinen Song – Das Tauschkonzert, Vol. 4 by various artists, Sampler 4 by 187 Strassenbande, Zauberland by Die Amigos, 25 Jahre Abenteuer Leben by Andrea Berg and MTV Unplugged by Peter Maffay. Ed Sheeran's ÷ ruled the charts for five weeks.

Number-one hits by week

See also
 List of number-one hits (Germany)
 List of German airplay number-one songs

References

Germany
2017
2017